Adiós, cigüeña, adiós (aka Goodbye, Stork, Goodbye) is a 1972 Spanish comedy-drama film. It is directed by Manuel Summers, composed by Antonio Pérez Olea and starring by Maria Isabel Álvarez, Francisco Villa and Curro Martín Summers.

This film is related with Del rosa al amarillo (1963) because it is focused on the childhood and the old age.

Cast

References

External links
 

Spanish comedy-drama films
1971 comedy-drama films
Children's comedy-drama films
Films directed by Manuel Summers
Films with screenplays by Antonio de Lara
Columbia Pictures films
Films shot in Madrid
1971 films